The 2007–08 Dayton Flyers men's basketball team represented the University of Dayton during the 2007–08 NCAA Division I men's basketball season. The Flyers, led by fifth year head coach Brian Gregory, played their home games at the University of Dayton Arena and were members of the Atlantic 10 Conference. They finished the season 23–11, 8–8 in A-10 play. They received an at-large bid to the NIT where they defeated Cleveland State in the first round and Illinois State in the second round before falling to eventual champion Ohio State in the quarterfinals. The Flyers started the season 14-1 and were ranked as high as 14th in the AP poll, the program's highest ranking since the 1967-68 season. Dayton finished the regular season 6-8 after injuries to starter Charles Little and highly rated freshman Chris Wright.

Previous season
The 2006–07 Dayton Flyers finished the season with an overall record of 19–12, with a record of 8–8 in the Atlantic 10 regular season. The Flyers started the season 10-1, with wins over Louisville, Holy Cross, and Creighton. The Flyers faltered in conference play, and fell to Xavier in the quarterfinals of the 2007 Atlantic 10 men's basketball tournament. They were not selected to play in a postseason tournament.

Offseason

Departures

Incoming transfers

Incoming recruits

Roster

Schedule

|-
!colspan=9 style="background:#C40023; color:#75B2DD;"| Exhibition

|-
!colspan=9 style="background:#C40023; color:#75B2DD;"| Non-conference regular season

|-
!colspan=9 style="background:#C40023; color:#75B2DD;"| Atlantic 10 regular season

|-
!colspan=9 style="background:#C40023; color:#75B2DD;"| Atlantic 10 tournament

|-
!colspan=9 style="background:#C40023; color:#75B2DD;"| NIT

References

Dayton Flyers men's basketball seasons
Dayton
Dayton
Dayton
Dayton